Aleksandra Sergeyevna Stepanova (born 21 June 1989) is a Russian handball player for Dinamo Volgograd and the Russian national team.

References

1989 births
Living people
Russian female handball players
Sportspeople from Izhevsk